The List of United States House of Representatives elections has been split into the following parts for convenience:
 List of United States House of Representatives elections (1789–1822)
 List of United States House of Representatives elections (1824–1854)
 List of United States House of Representatives elections (1856–present)
 List of Speaker of the United States House of Representatives elections

See also 
 List of elections in the United States
 Congressional stagnation in the United States

Elections
 
House of Representatives